Ove Lemicka (born 31 May 1961) is a Norwegian politician for the Labour Party.

He served as a deputy representative to the Norwegian Parliament from Hordaland during the terms 1989–1993 and 1993–1997. In total he met during 11 days of parliamentary session.

References

1961 births
Living people
Deputy members of the Storting
Labour Party (Norway) politicians
Hordaland politicians
Place of birth missing (living people)
20th-century Norwegian politicians